Rekha Verma is politician from Uttar Pradesh, India.

Life
Verma was elected to the Lok Sabha, the lower house of the Parliament of India from Dhaurahra Seat, Uttar Pradesh as a member of the Bharatiya Janata Party. She got 360357 votes and defeated Daud of Bahujan Samaj Party who got 234682 votes. She is a National Vice President of the BJP.

References

External links
 Official biographical sketch in Parliament of India website

India MPs 2014–2019
Lok Sabha members from Uttar Pradesh
Living people
People from Lakhimpur Kheri district
Women in Uttar Pradesh politics
Bharatiya Janata Party politicians from Uttar Pradesh
21st-century Indian women politicians
21st-century Indian politicians
1973 births
People from Kanpur
India MPs 2019–present